Bryan Health (formerly BryanLGH Health System) is an American not-for-profit healthcare organization located in Lincoln, Nebraska. The system operates an acute-care hospital, several outpatient clinics and a College of Health Sciences, as well as a physician network and a heart institute.

History
The organization was formed in 1997 by the merger of two pre-existing hospitals in Lincoln: Bryan Memorial Hospital and Lincoln General Hospital. The name BryanLGH was chosen to reflect the names of the pre-existing hospitals, both of which had been in operation since 1926. The College of Health Sciences also opened in 1926 as Bryan School of Nursing. Bryan's physician network and heart institute have been added since the merger.

The organization's name is derived from William Jennings Bryan's gift of land to the United Methodist Church for a hospital in 1922.

The Vice President of United States Richard Bruce Cheney was born in Bryan Memorial Hospital at 1941.

Healthcare facilities

The hospital known as Bryan Medical Center, founded in 1926, operates as two campuses, Bryan Medical Center East and Bryan Medical Center West, which are often still referred to locally as Bryan Memorial and Lincoln General. In 2012 the name was changed from BryanLGH Medical Center. The hospital has 672 beds and serves patients from throughout Nebraska and neighboring states.

The system operates the Crete Area Medical Center (founded in 1950), a full-service rural health clinic in Crete, Nebraska with 24 licensed beds. Bryan Health operates the Kearney Regional Medical Center with 93 licensed beds founded in 2014 in Kearney, Nebraska.

Leadership
Russ Gronewold was named CEO of Bryan in 2019. He was previously CFO. The appointment was controversial because of Gronewold's prior affiliation with the Nebraska Family Alliance, a socially conservative lobbying group.

College of Health Sciences
The College of Health Sciences offers undergraduate degrees in Nursing, Ultrasound, Pre-med, Pre-PT and other health professions, and a Doctoral degree in Nurse Anesthesia Practice an Education Doctorate with Emphasis in Nursing Education and a Masters in Nursing with a track in Leadership or Education to choose from, as well as certificate programs for ancillary health professions.

References

External links
Bryan Health Homepage

Healthcare in Nebraska
Companies based in Lincoln, Nebraska
Hospital networks in the United States
Medical and health organizations based in Nebraska
Private universities and colleges in Nebraska